The Strange Chores is an Australian animated television series that premiered on ABC Me on 31 October 2019. The series was created by Charlie Aspinwall and Daley Pearson, best known for their work on Bluey, and is a co-production between Ludo Studio and Media World Production.

The show centres around two teenage warrior-heroes (Charlie And Pierce) and a spirited ghost girl (Que) who master the skills they need to replace an ageing monster-slayer by doing his supernatural chores.

The series was renewed for a second season.

Plot 
Two teenagers, Charlie and Pierce, discover that their "kooky neighbour" Old Man Helsing's house at the end of their street is secretly a portal to supernatural worlds. Helsing thinks he might be getting too old for all his adventures, so he allows them to become his apprentices. A mischievous ghost girl, Que, joins them on their adventures as they complete Helsing's freaky, bizarre, and sometimes terrifying chores.

Characters

Main 
 Charlie - A bravado but only gets him so far and that's usually into more trouble than he can handle
 Pierce - Charlie's tech support sidekick who goes into a cold panic of go viral
 Que - She is just like any teenager but for being an ancient Japanese ghost she can go on quick & complicated to still figuring out here
 Helsing - An elderly monster-slayer that decides to accept Charlie and Pierce as his apprentices to do his chores for him
 Snorp - A small green dog-like creature who is Helsing's pet

Production 

The Strange Chores is produced entirely in Australia by Ludo Studio and Media World Production, with animation provided by 12Field Animation using Toon Boom Harmony. Production on the first season of the show took 95 weeks including over 5,000 scenes, 400 rigs, 500 props and 3000 background designs. Ludo aimed for an older audience for this show (8 to 12-years-old) when compared to their massively popular preschool series Bluey.

Episodes

Broadcast 
The first season of The Strange Chores was released to ABC iview on 31 October 2019, accompanying the series premiere on the same day. The episode "Don't Trick or Tweet" also aired as a preview before the first two episodes. In the United Kingdom and Ireland, the series aired on Pop on 1 November, one day after the Australian premiere. In 2020, it was also broadcast on Disney Channel Asia and CBC Kids.

The second season was released to ABC iview on 24 June 2022, which, again, accompanied the season premiere on the same day. Also, like the first season, the episode “Haunt The House” was aired as a preview to the season on April 8 of that same year.

References

External links 
 
  on ABC iview

Strange Chores
Strange Chores
Strange Chores
Strange Chores
Strange Chores
Strange Chores
Strange Chores
Strange Chores
Strange Chores
Strange Chores